The Mackay Region is a local government area located in North Queensland, Queensland, Australia. Established in 2008, it was preceded by three previous local government areas with modern histories extending back as far as 1869.

It has an estimated operating budget of A$118 million.

History 
Yuwibara  (also known as Yuibera, Yuri, Juipera, Yuwiburra) is an Australian Aboriginal language spoken on Yuwibara country. It is closely related to the Biri languages/dialects. The Yuwibara language region includes the landscape within the local government boundaries of the Mackay Region.

Prior to 2008, the Mackay Region was an entire area of three previous and distinct local government areas:

 the City of Mackay;
 the Shire of Mirani;
 and the Shire of Sarina.

The city had its beginning in the Mackay Municipality which was proclaimed on 22 September 1869 under the Municipal Institutions Act 1864. Its first mayor was David Dalrymple, and the council first met on 1 December 1869. It achieved a measure of autonomy in 1878 with the enactment of the Local Government Act. With the passage of the Local Authorities Act 1902, Mackay became a Town on 31 March 1903, and was ultimately proclaimed a City on 17 August 1918.

On 11 December 1879, the Pioneer Division came into being as one of Queensland's 74 divisions created under the Divisional Boards Act 1879 on 11 November 1879, chaired by John Ewen Davidson. On 31 March 1903, Pioneer became a Shire. Two areas split away from it over the next decade; the Shire of Sarina on 1 January 1912, and the Shire of Mirani on 4 September 1913.

On 21 November 1991, the Electoral and Administrative Review Commission, created two years earlier, produced its second report, and recommended that local government boundaries in the Mackay area be rationalised. The Local Government (Mackay and Pioneer) Regulation 1993 was gazetted on 17 December 1993, and on 30 March 1994, the two amalgamated into a larger City of Mackay, which first met on 8 April 1994.

In July 2007, the Local Government Reform Commission released a report making recommendations for statewide reform of local government boundaries, and recommended that the three areas of Mackay, Mirani and Sarina amalgamate, due mainly to Mackay's role as a regional centre and all three shires' involvement in sugar production. The City of Mackay endorsed the suggestion, but the two shires proposed alternative options. In the end, the commission's proposal was unchanged. On 15 March 2008, the City and Shires formally ceased to exist, and elections were held on the same day to elect councillors and a mayor to the Regional Council.

Mayors 

 2000–present: Gregory Roy Williamson

Wards
The Mackay Regional Council does not contain divisions or wards and remains undivided and has an elected body consisting of 10 councillors and a mayor. Current councillors and there relevant political affiliations are as follows:

Towns and localities 
The Mackay Region includes the following settlements:

Mackay suburbs:
 Mackay City
 East Mackay
 West Mackay
 North Mackay
 South Mackay
 Andergrove
 Beaconsfield
 Blacks Beach
 Bucasia
 Cremorne
 Dolphin Heads
 Eimeo
 Erakala
 Foulden
 Glenella
 Mackay Harbour
 Mount Pleasant
 Nindaroo
 Ooralea
 Paget
 Racecourse
 Richmond
 Rural View
 Shoal Point
 Slade Point
 Te Kowai

Mackay towns:
 Bakers Creek
 Ball Bay
 Brampton Island
 Calen
 Dalrymple Bay
 Farleigh
 Halliday Bay
 Hampden
 Kuttabul
 Laguna Quays
 Lindeman Island
 McEwens Beach
 Midge Point
 Mount Ossa
 Oakenden
 Pindi Pindi
 Seaforth
 St Helens Beach
 Walkerston
National Parks:
 Cape Hillsborough NP
 Eungella NP
 Mount Jukes NP
 Mount Martin NP
 Mount Ossa NP
 Pioneer Peaks NP
 Reliance Creek NP

Mackay localities:
 Alexandra
 Balberra
 Balnagowan
 Belmunda
 Bloomsbury
 Chelona
 Dumbleton
 Dunnrock
 Greenmount
 Habana
 Homebush
 Mentmore
 Mount Charlton
 Mount Pelion
 Palmyra
 Pleystowe
 Rosella
 Sandiford
 Sunnyside
 The Leap
 Victoria Plains
 Yalboroo

Mirani area:
 Benholme (village)
 Brightly (locality)
 Crediton (village)
 Dalrymple Heights (village)
 Dows Creek (town)
 Eton (town)
 Eungella (village)
 Eungella Dam
 Finch Hatton (town)
 Gargett (town)
 Hazledean (village)
 Kinchant Dam (locality)
 Marian (town)
 Mirani (town)
 Mia Mia (village)
 Mount Martin (village)
 Netherdale (village)
 North Eton (locality)
 Owens Creek (village)
 Pinevale (village)
 Pinnacle (locality)
 Septimus (town)

Sarina area:
 Alligator Creek (town)
 Armstrong Beach (town)
 Campwin Beach (town)
 Freshwater Point (town)
 Grasstree Beach (town)
 Half Tide Beach (town)
 Hay Point (town)
 Koumala (town)
 Louisa Creek (village)
 Munbura (village)
 Sarina (town)
 Sarina Beach (town)
 Sarina Range
 West Plane Creek (village)

Population

The population figures for each of the predecessor local government areas prior to the 2008 amalgamation:

The estimated population figures (official census population figures are in bold) for the amalgamated Mackay Region from 2008

Services 
The Mackay Regional Council operates libraries in Mackay, Mount Pleasant, Walkerston, Sarina and Mirani. A mobile library service visits the following districts on a fortnightly schedule: Yalboroo, Bloomsbury, Midge Point, Ball Bay, Seaforth, Koumala, Swayneville, Hay Point, St Helens Beach, Calen, Shoal Point, Oakenden, Habana, Blacks Beach, Slade Point, Hampden, Marian, Gargett, Finch Hatton, Homebush, Chelona, McEwens Beach and Bucasia.

References

External links 

 

 
North Queensland
Local government areas of Queensland